Tarboro Tars was the primary name of a minor league baseball team based in Tarboro, North Carolina. The team competed in the Coastal Plain League from 1937 to 1941 and from 1946 to 1952. The team used several other nicknames during its history, and had brief affiliations with the Boston Red Sox and Philadelphia Athletics of Major League Baseball.

In the team's 12 seasons of play, it qualified for the postseason five times, advanced to the league championship series three times (1937, 1940, and 1948), and won the championship twice (1940 and 1948).

Tarboro had previously fielded minor league teams in 1900 and 1901, and for part of the 1921 season when the Petersburg Goobers relocated to Tarboro from Petersburg, Virginia, in early August.

Notable players
Several players with Tarboro also made appearances in Major League Baseball:

 1937: Soup Campbell, Snake Henry
 1938: Campbell, Henry, Buster Maynard
 1939: Bob Allen, Bill Donovan
 1940: Hank Schenz, Bill Steinecke
 1941: Bob Hooper, Ray Murray, Frankie Zak
 1946: —

 1947: Otey Clark
 1948: Jake Daniel
 1949: Joe Antolick, Bob Zick
 1950: Antolick, Zick
 1951: Eric Mackenzie, Joe Rullo
 1952: —

Results by season

 Other sources list the team's 1937 nickname as Serpents, 1940 nickname as Cubs, and A's during 1948–1951.

 In 1951, Tarboro and the Greenville Robins withdrew from the league in early June.

References

Baseball teams established in 1937
Baseball teams disestablished in 1952
1937 establishments in North Carolina
1952 disestablishments in North Carolina
Defunct minor league baseball teams
Defunct baseball teams in North Carolina
Boston Red Sox minor league affiliates
Philadelphia Athletics minor league affiliates
Edgecombe County, North Carolina
Coastal Plain League (minor league) teams